, officially HARD OFF ECO Stadium Niigata, is a baseball stadium in Niigata, Niigata opened on July 1, 2009.  It is primarily used for baseball and is the home of the Niigata Albirex Baseball Club.  The stadium hosted one NPB All-Star Game in 2010.

Access
Transit bus
There is a bus stop ' ', 2 minutes walk away from the stadium. Transit bus operated by Niigata Kotsu S70, S71, S72 (line: S7) runs from Niigata Station South Exit.

See also
Denka Big Swan Stadium

References

External links 
Official site

Baseball venues in Japan
Sports venues in Niigata Prefecture
Albirex Niigata
Buildings and structures in Niigata (city)
Sports venues completed in 2009
2009 establishments in Japan